"Joy to the World" is the eleventh episode of the fifth season of House and the ninety-seventh episode overall. It aired on December 9, 2008.

Plot

A troubled sixteen-year-old, Natalie, is singing at her school's Christmas program when she suddenly becomes disoriented and vomits. She is brought to Princeton-Plainsboro Teaching Hospital, where the team discovers her liver is failing for an unknown reason. In House's office, the team exchange Christmas gifts when House receives a mysterious gift. The present turns out to be Dr. Joseph Bell's Manual of The Operations of Surgery. House, annoyed, throws it in the trash. Afterwards, House conducts a differential diagnosis, with the team entertaining ideas such as alcohol abuse and pill-popping, but none of the symptoms fit the entire picture. When Chase and Kutner question Natalie's classmates, one admits they slipped "magic mushrooms" into her food. Meanwhile, Foreman and Thirteen are still involved in the Huntington's drug trial. A woman whose disease is quite advanced drops out of the trial, saying that Foreman told her to "get over it" when her medication made her nauseous. Thirteen, annoyed, accuses Foreman of being like House.

After briefly suggesting the gift was from a former patient and old flame Irene Adler, Wilson tells the team that it is in fact last year's gift from Wilson himself, which House never opened. Wilson accuses House of needing to create the false illusion of a gift because he just cannot be nice to anyone. They bet that House cannot get thanked by a patient.  Later, after Natalie's tox-screen was clean, Taub and Kutner find Tylenol in her school locker, which makes them think she tried to kill herself by acetaminophen toxicity. They later suspect tuberculosis, thinking she might have picked up something from the soup kitchen she normally attends.

To win the bet with Wilson, House behaves kindly and caring toward his patients. A naive woman, Whitney, comes to the clinic with a terrible headache and compliments House on his hospitality, to which he responds, "If you can't be nice, why be a doctor?" He later deduces she is pregnant, much to her surprise. She insists that she and her fiancé are virgins, and asks for a paternity test when House suggests that she has had an affair. After sharing the test results with them, he looks surprised, and leaves to repeat the test. He returns with the same results, and with a look of disbelief, states that Whitney is pregnant as a result of human parthenogenesis, a never-seen-before phenomenon. Her baby only has maternal genes due to a spontaneous gene mutation which fertilized her egg, without ever needing male sperm. Her baby will be a virgin birth. Later, however, it is revealed that House faked the results and told them the story to cover up Whitney's infidelity, thereby 'saving' their relationship but saddling the fiancé with a cheating potential future wife and another man's child.

Things make a turn for the worse for Natalie, as she has a seizure, ruling out TB but bringing her brain into the differential, along with the liver and lungs. Kutner suggests a mold allergy, for which the team test her.  Natalie admits to buying alcohol from her friend Simon, whom Kutner and Taub question. Taub suggests alcohol poisoning, but it turns out that she hardly drank any of the alcohol and had only bought it to impress Simon. She goes into cardiac arrest, ruling out the alcohol theory. But her high blood alkaline phosphatase level nonetheless suggests leukemia, and Wilson is brought in to help.  While Cuddy desperately tries to rule leukemia out, Wilson discusses its likelihood and says that she will die, even if they kill all the cancer, due to her failing heart and liver. A double transplant would not even save her. Cuddy then has an epiphany after talking with House about the pregnant couple and gravely realizes the only other disease that explains everything: post-partum eclampsia, which means that Natalie must have got pregnant and had a child. This turns out to be correct, and her friend Simon is the unknowing father. Natalie explains that she gave birth in an abandoned house but her daughter was stillborn. Cuddy searches the house and finds the baby girl, alive, being cared for by a pair of homeless squatters, and brings the baby back to the hospital where she reunites her with her mother. Unfortunately, due to the extent of Natalie's failing organs, she will die within hours (although this is not shown in the episode). The baby is in good health but is kept for observation as she is premature.

In the end, the whole team is full of Christmas spirit. Kutner finds a former classmate he used to bully and apologizes to him. During the episode he is shown to be furious about Natalie being bullied and when asked says that he was never bullied. Cuddy plans to become a foster parent and adopt the baby, as neither grandparent wants to care for her as she will recall memories too painful for them to handle, with House wishing her "Merry Christmas, Cuddy." Thirteen tells Foreman that he is not like House, after he welcomed back the woman who dropped out of the trial and is taking better care of her. Foreman and Thirteen passionately kiss.

External links 

 "Joy to the World" at Fox.com
 

House (season 5) episodes
American Christmas television episodes
2008 American television episodes
Television episodes about bullying
Television episodes directed by David Straiton

fr:Saison 5 de Dr House#Épisode 11 : Le Divin Enfant